Nina Hudson Turner ( Hudson; born December 7, 1967) is an American politician and television personality. A member of the Democratic Party, she was a Cleveland City Council member from 2006 to 2008 and a member of the Ohio Senate from 2008 until 2014. Turner was the Democratic nominee for Ohio Secretary of State in 2014, but lost in the general election against incumbent Jon Husted, receiving 35.5 percent of the vote.  Her politics have been variously described as progressive, left-wing, or far-left.

Turner supported Bernie Sanders in his 2016 presidential campaign, and became president of the Sanders-affiliated group Our Revolution in 2017. She served as a national co-chair of Sanders's 2020 presidential campaign. Turner ran in the Democratic primary for 2021 special election for Ohio's 11th congressional district, and conceded the race after losing to Shontel Brown by a margin of 5.66% of the vote. Turner unsuccessfully challenged Brown for the seat again in 2022, garnering 33.5% of the vote to Brown's 66.5% in the Democratic primary.

Early life and education
Turner is a native of Cleveland, Ohio. She was born Nina Hudson, to parents, Faye and Taalib, the first of seven children. Her father and mother separated by the time Turner was five years old. Her mother worked as a preacher and as a nurse's aide in a senior home, struggled with high blood pressure all her life and died in 1992 at the age of 42.

Turner graduated from Cleveland's John F. Kennedy High School in 1986. She earned a Bachelor of Arts degree in history and a Master of Arts degree from Cleveland State University.
She has an Associate in Arts degree from Cuyahoga Community College where she is now a tenured assistant professor of history.

Early career 
She began her professional career as an aide in 2001 to then-state Senator Rhine McLin. Turner worked for Cleveland Mayor Michael R. White. She later lobbied for the Cleveland Metropolitan School District at the state and federal levels.

Cleveland City Council (2006–2008) 
Turner made a run for Cleveland City Council in 2001, but was defeated by the incumbent, Joe Jones. In November 2004, Jones resigned his City Council seat. His wife, Tonya Jones, was the top vote-getter in a September nine-way, non-partisan primary race to select a candidate to fill Jones' seat. In the November 2005 election, Turner defeated Tonya Jones to become the Council Member for Ward One, the first African American woman in the seat.

Turner served on Cleveland City Council from 2006 to 2008.

Ohio State Senate (2008–2014) 

In September 2008, Senator Lance Mason resigned his 25th District seat in the Ohio Senate to accept an appointment to the Cuyahoga County Court of Common Pleas. Turner was unanimously selected by the Ohio Senate Democratic caucus to serve the remainder of Mason's four-year Senate term. She resigned her City Council seat to accept the appointment on September 15, 2008. In the 128th General Assembly, Turner was the Ranking Minority member on the Senate Highways & Transportation and Judiciary Criminal Justice Committees.

Turner won a full term in 2010, running unopposed in the general election. She was elected as Minority Whip halfway through the 129th General Assembly. She was Minority Whip in the following General Assembly. By then her district consisted of the eastern side of Cuyahoga County as well as half of Lake County (including the Village of Fairport Harbor, the Village of Grand River, the City of Painesville and parts of Painesville Township; but excluding the City of Kirtland, the Village of Kirtland Hills, the Village of Waite Hill, the City of Willoughby Hills and most of the City of Mentor).

Turner considered running against incumbent Marcia Fudge in the 2012 Democratic primary for Ohio's 11th congressional district but declined, opting to stay in the State Senate.

As a political statement against legislation attempting to restrict women's access to contraception and abortion, in March 2012, Turner introduced a bill to regulate men's reproductive health. Before getting a prescription for erectile dysfunction drugs, a man would have to get a notarized affidavit signed by a recent sexual partner affirming his impotency, consult with a sex therapist and receive a cardiac stress test. She said the proposed statute would be parallel to recent legislation written by male legislators restricting women's reproductive health and that she was equally concerned about men's reproductive health. The proposed legislation was not meant to be passed, but as a way of bringing attention to similar bills targeted towards women.

In January 2014, Turner led unsuccessful efforts to change Ohio's rape custody law. It permits visitation and custody by men who father children via rape or sexual assault against a woman or girl. Turner wanted to protect rape victims/survivors and children conceived as a result of rape by preventing parental custody rights from being provided to rapists who fathered their children. She said it may be difficult for people to contemplate that a person would desire parental rights for a child conceived due to rape, though it occurs. She and fellow Democrat Charleta Tavares introduced SB-171. It would allow rape victims to file court claims terminating their attacker's parental rights and permit a mother to place her child up for adoption without being required to seek her attacker's approval. The bill was stalled in the senate.

Community college professor 
Turner has been a member of the faculty at her alma mater Cuyahoga Community College since 1998. She was an assistant professor of history there, where she taught African-American history, African-American women's history, American history, and women's studies.

Work with Bernie Sanders

Bernie Sanders 2016 presidential campaign 
In the 2016 presidential election, Turner initially supported Hillary Clinton for the Democratic nomination but switched her support to Bernie Sanders. After Clinton won the nomination, Turner was invited by Jill Stein to become the Green Party's nominee for Vice President, but she declined saying, "I believe that the Democratic Party is worth fighting for." Turner went on to decline to endorse Hillary Clinton in the 2016 United States Presidential Election against Donald Trump, saying that she would endorse the party's platform in the election not an individual.

In December 2016, Turner served as a member of the DNC Unity Reform Commission in Washington D.C. to address concerns that arose regarding the presidential nominating process, particularly regarding the roles of caucuses, superdelegates, and corporate donations.

Our Revolution 
In 2016, Turner became the president and public face of Our Revolution, a progressive political action organization that grew out of Bernie Sanders's 2016 presidential campaign.

According to a May 2018 review by Politico, Our Revolution was "flailing" and "in disarray" a year into her leadership. By May 2018, the organization's monthly fundraising totals were one-third of what they had been May 2017. According to Politico, the group operated primarily as a vehicle for Sanders and had "shown no ability to tip a major Democratic election in its favor—despite possessing Sanders's email list, the envy of the Democratic Party—and can claim no major wins in 2018 as its own". There was infighting within the group as figures in the organization speculated whether Turner was using the organization for a presidential run of her own. They questioned whether she was settling scores from 2016 with the Democratic National Committee and criticized her hiring of associates to senior positions within the organization. Our Revolution also endorsed Dennis Kucinich in the race for the Democratic nomination for the 2018 Ohio governorship; questions were raised about Turner's close relation to Kucinich's running mate.

Bernie Sanders 2020 presidential campaign 
On February 21, 2019, Turner was named a national co-chair of the Bernie Sanders 2020 presidential campaign. She appeared on Hardball with Chris Matthews, Meet the Press, Politics Nation, State of the Union, and other programs in support of Sanders.

A few weeks before the 2020 Democratic National Convention, Turner expressed her disdain for being forced to choose between presumptive Democratic nominee Joe Biden and incumbent Donald Trump. She told Peter Nicholas of The Atlantic, "it's like saying to somebody, ‘You have a bowl of shit in front of you, and all you’ve got to do is eat half of it instead of the whole thing.’ It's still shit." Turner declined to endorse Joe Biden in the 2020 United States Presidential election after Biden officially became the Democratic nominee.

In September 2020, in partnership with Mercury Public Affairs, Turner launched the progressive public affairs firm Amare Public Affairs.

Candidacy runs

2014 Secretary of State election 

On July 1, 2013, Turner declared her candidacy for Ohio Secretary of State, challenging Republican Jon Husted. On September 18, 2014, Bill Clinton officially supported Turner's candidacy. Turner was defeated 60%–35% by Husted.

2021 Ohio's 11th congressional district special election

2022 Ohio 11th congressional district election 

In September 2021, Turner filed paperwork with the FEC to run for Congress in the same district in 2022. Although she did not officially declare her intention to run for the seat at that time, her filing "leaves the door open. Turner has conceded in the past that she will make another run for Congress," according to The Plain Dealer.

On January 26, 2022, Turner announced her intention to run against Brown for the second time. Turner was not re-endorsed by prominent members of the Congressional Progressive Caucus who endorsed her last year.

On May 3, 2022, Brown defeated Turner in a landslide with 66% of votes to Turner's 34%.

Political views 
Turner's politics have been described in the media as progressive, left-wing, or far-left. She identifies as a democratic socialist.

During Turner's runs for congress, she supported Medicare for All, a Green New Deal, a $15 minimum wage, legalizing cannabis, canceling student debt, and tuition-free tertiary education.

Television appearances 
Turner has worked for CNN as a contributor. In June 2017, she began a regular segment on The Real News Network called The Nina Turner Show. In 2018, Turner portrayed a fictitious version of herself in the pilot episode of the television series Black Lightning, praising actor Cress Williams' character Jefferson Pierce.

On September 14, 2021, Turner was hired by The Young Turks as a contributor and co-anchor.

Electoral history

2021 Ohio 11th congressional district special election

2022 Ohio 11th congressional district

Personal life
Turner is married to Jeffery Turner, Sr. They have a son, Jeffrey Turner, Jr., a lieutenant in the Ohio National Guard. They reside in Cleveland while Turner works out of Washington, D.C.

Turner is a Christian and has publicly stated how her faith forms a basis for her political convictions.

References

External links

 
Profile at the Ohio Statehouse Museum

|-

1967 births
21st-century American women politicians
African-American Christians
African-American city council members in Ohio
African-American state legislators in Ohio
African-American women in politics
American democratic socialists
Bernie Sanders 2020 presidential campaign
Candidates in the 2021 United States elections
Candidates in the 2022 United States House of Representatives elections
Cleveland City Council members
Cleveland State University alumni
Cuyahoga Community College alumni
Living people
Left-wing populism in the United States
Democratic Party Ohio state senators
Women city councillors in Ohio
Women state legislators in Ohio
21st-century American politicians